Mezzo-soprano Michele Detwiler (born 1976 in California) is an American opera singer.

Since 2000, she has sung over fifteen roles with regional companies on the West Coast, favoring Gustav Mahler, Richard Strauss, bel canto and French repertoire.

From 2001-2007, she was a Principal Artist and Guest Artist with Opera San Jose where she sang in eighteen productions ranging from lyric to dramatic repertoire. In addition, Ms. Detwiler has sung with Sacramento Opera, West Bay Opera, Trinity Lyric Opera, San Francisco Lyric Opera, Mission City Opera, and Apollo Sierra Opera.

Critics have described her instrument as "amber-voiced", "a velvety mezzo soprano voice with excellent range", with some performances being cited as "riveting" and holding "center stage commandingly".

Recent engagements

Main Roles
• Zerlina (Don Giovanni)
• Dorabella (Così fan tutte)
• Stefano (Roméo et Juliette)
• Pauline (Pique Dame)
• Romeo (I Capuleti e i Montecchi)
• Meg Page (Falstaff)
• Suzuki (Madama Butterfly)
• Carmen (Carmen)
• Octavian (Der Rosenkavalier)
• Composer (Ariadne auf Naxos)
• Elizabeth Proctor (The Crucible)

In Concert
• Messiah (Handel)
• Requiem (Mozart)
• Christmas Oratorio (Camille Saint-Saëns)
• Die Geburt Christi (Herzogenberg)
• Voices of Light (Einhorn)

Performance History

References

External links
www.operasj.org Opera San Jose Biography

American operatic mezzo-sopranos
Living people
1976 births
Place of birth missing (living people)
Singers from California
21st-century American singers
21st-century American women singers
Classical musicians from California